609 Fulvia is a minor planet orbiting the Sun.

References

External links
 
 

Background asteroids
Fulvia
Fulvia
19060924